Wrea Green railway station was on the Blackpool South to Kirkham line. It served the village of Wrea Green, in Lancashire, England, and closed in 1961.

The station opened in 1846. A single-track line to Lytham branched off the Kirkham-to-Poulton line at right angles, heading south-south-west to Wrea Green.

When the line was connected to the Blackpool and Lytham Railway in 1874, the line was doubled and the corner between Kirkham and Wrea Green was cut by a new southwesterly line.

References

Disused railway stations in the Borough of Fylde
Former Preston and Wyre Joint Railway stations
Railway stations in Great Britain opened in 1846
Railway stations in Great Britain closed in 1961